Stadion Antonio Trenidat is a multi-use stadium in Rincon, on the island of Bonaire.  It is currently used mostly for football matches.  The stadium holds 1,500 people.

External links
Venue information

Football venues in Bonaire
Buildings and structures in Bonaire